Umbrinosphaeria is a genus of lignicolous fungi in the family Trichosphaeriaceae. This is a monotypic genus, containing the single species Umbrinosphaeria caesariata.

References

Trichosphaeriales
Monotypic Sordariomycetes genera